TVC may refer to:

Television
 TVC News, a Nigerian television channel
 TVC Communications, a former television equipment distributor
 TVC, trade jargon for television commercial
TVC Networks, a Mexican cable network conglomerate, parent of TVC Deportes
Televicentro (Honduras) (TVC), a broadcasting conglomerate
BBC Television Centre, the former headquarters of BBC Television
Televisió de Catalunya, Catalonia's public broadcasting network
Televisión Canaria, a Canarian television channel
TV Centre (Russia), a Russian television network

Places
Cherry Capital Airport, (IATA code TVC, FAA LID code: TVC) serving Traverse City, Michigan
Thiruvananthapuram Central railway station (station code: TVC)

Other uses
Tatsunoko vs. Capcom: Ultimate All-Stars, a 2008 fighting game
Thrust vector control, a method of steering aircraft and missiles
Tinea versicolor, spots on the skin caused by yeast
Total viable count, a measure of microorganisms
Traditional Values Coalition, a United States conservative Christian group
TVC (computer), a Hungarian home computer made in the 1980s

See also

 "TVC 15", a song by David Bowie